Perseis may refer to:

Perseis (Paeonia), an ancient Macedonian city
 Perse (mythology), or Perseis, a figure in Greek mythology
 Perseis, a genus of moths, now known as Parachma
 Perseis, a disused synonym of a genus of sea cucumbers, Bohadschia